Krystal Lee Muccioli (born 1989) is an American beauty pageant titleholder who was crowned Miss New Hampshire 2010 and was a contestant in the Miss America 2011 pageant. Muccioli was a successful child actress appearing in several commercials, plays, movies, and television series.

Early years 
Born in Nashua, New Hampshire, Muccioli started modeling, acting, and competing in pageants at the age of six. Her early successes landed her commercial roles for McDonald's and Ford Motor Company alongside athletes Drew Bledsoe and Willie McGinest of the New England Patriots. Both commercials airing during the Super Bowl of those years. In addition, she appeared in several Off Broadway plays and had uncredited acting roles in Osmosis Jones, Big Daddy, and State and Main. Muccioli played a child murder victim in the television legal drama series Law & Order.

Education 
Muccioli attended Souhegan High School in Amherst, New Hampshire, and is a graduate of Nashua High School North. She is currently a junior at the University of New Hampshire studying public health. She plans to attain a master's degree and become a policymaker for the Centers for Disease Control and Prevention.

Miss America 2011 competition 
Muccioli's platform for the 2011 Miss America pageant was "Volunteerism: Be the Change you Wish to see in the World". Throughout her life she has raised thousands of dollars for charities including the Children's Miracle Network, the United Way, Big Brothers Big Sisters of America, the Haiti Relief Organization, and others.

References

External links
 
 Miss New Hampshire official website

Miss America 2011 delegates
People from Manchester, New Hampshire
University of New Hampshire alumni
American child actresses
1989 births
Living people
People from Amherst, New Hampshire
Female models from New Hampshire
American stage actresses
Actresses from New Hampshire
20th-century American actresses
People from Nashua, New Hampshire